"Dear Lord" is a song recorded by German rapper Kollegah for his seventh studio album Monument (2018). The single was made available for digital download and streaming audio on 5 October 2018, through Alpha Music Empire.

Background
Kollegah released his sixth studio album, Imperator, in December 2016. He released two collaborative studio albums with German rapper Farid Bang—Jung Brutal Gutaussehend 3 (2017) and Platin war gestern (2018). In September 2018, he released "Wie ein Alpha", his first solo single in more than 16 months. The second single, "Dear Lord", was announced through Instagram and was released on 5 October 2018.

Music video
The music video was directed by Adam Film and was shot in Vietnam and in the United Arab Emirates.

Personnel
Recorded at Quad Recordings Studios in New York City and Octalogic in Ludwigshafen.
 Kollegah – vocals, songwriting
 AraabMuzik – production
 Kostas Karagiozidis – mix engineering, mastering

Charts

References

2018 singles
2018 songs
Kollegah songs